Thomas Duffy VC (1806 – 24 December 1868), born in Mount Temple (Caulry), Athlone, County Westmeath, was an Irish recipient of the Victoria Cross, the highest and most prestigious award for gallantry in the face of the enemy that can be awarded to British and Commonwealth forces.

Details
He was approximately 51 years old, and a private in the 1st Madras European Fusiliers (later The Royal Dublin Fusiliers), Indian Army during the Indian Mutiny when the following deed took place on 26 September 1857 at Lucknow, India for which he was awarded the VC:
A 24-pounder gun which had been used against the enemy on the previous day was left in an exposed position and all efforts to reach it were unsuccessful, so heavy was the fire maintained on it by the mutineers. Private Duffy, however, who went out with two others, managed to fasten a rope to the gun in such a manner that it could be pulled away and was saved from falling into the hands of the enemy. His citation reads:

He died in Dublin on 24 December 1868 and is buried in Glasnevin Cemetery.

His Victoria Cross was offered at auction on 27 October 1902. Today it is displayed at the National Army Museum in Chelsea, England.

References

The Register of the Victoria Cross (1981, 1988 and 1997)

Ireland's VCs (Dept of Economic Development, 1995)
Monuments to Courage (David Harvey, 1999)
Irish Winners of the Victoria Cross (Richard Doherty & David Truesdale, 2000)

External links
Location of grave and VC medal (Dublin)

1805 births
1868 deaths
19th-century Irish people
Irish soldiers in the British East India Company Army
Irish recipients of the Victoria Cross
Indian Rebellion of 1857 recipients of the Victoria Cross
Burials at Glasnevin Cemetery
People from Athlone
People from County Westmeath
Military personnel from County Westmeath